Bebri Parish is an administrative unit of Aizkraukle Municipality in the Vidzeme region of Latvia.

Towns, villages and settlements of Bebri Parish 
Blankas 
Gaidupes 
Jaunbebri 
Ozoli 
Tupiešēni
Vecbebri
Vēži
Zutēni

References

Parishes of Latvia
Aizkraukle Municipality
Vidzeme